The Goodbye Kiss is Jacky Cheung's fifth Mandopop album, which was released on 5 March 1993.

The Mandopop album was a great success in the Greater China region. The album sold over 5 million copies in 1993 throughout Asia, including 1,360,000 copies in Taiwan alone, and the album is one of three million-selling Jacky's album there and it still holds the record as Taiwan's second-selling album. In early 1994, Hong Kong's popular music reached a historic high point in Mainland China, the album sold 2.2 million legitimate copies there, despite significant levels of piracy,  and the influence of the album in China was higher than previous popular songs. In Singapore, the album sold 600,000 copies and still holds record as Singapore's best selling album in any repertoire. In Malaysia, the album is said to had sold more than half a million copies, and continues to hold the record for the best-selling non-English international album there (by comparison, Malaysia's highest selling album sold more than 700,000 copies).

In 2003, Michael Learns to Rock covered the title track, "Goodbye Kiss" in English and released it as "Take Me to Your Heart". The song has also been covered by many Asian musicians, such as Jay Chou, Anson Hu, Justin Lo, and others.

Track listing

References

Jacky Cheung albums
1993 albums
Mandopop albums